The , abbreviated as ICC Kyoto and previously called the Kyoto International Conference Hall, is a large conference facility located at Takaragaike, Sakyō-ku, Kyoto, Kyoto Prefecture, Japan. The Kyoto Protocol was signed in this hall.

The center was designed by architect Sachio Otani to an unusual hexagonal framework, resulting in few vertical walls or columns, and opened in 1966 with an addition in 1973. It is a rare remaining example of Metabolism in Japan (the newer and more famous Nakagin Capsule Tower Building is undergoing demolition ). Today the total facility provides 156,000 m² of meeting space, and consists of the main Conference Hall with large meeting room (capacity 2,000) and a number of smaller rooms, an Annex Hall (capacity 1,500) and Event Hall, with the Grand Prince Hotel Kyoto nearby. Both Main Hall and Annex Hall are equipped with simultaneous interpreting facilities for 12 languages.

It is located north of downtown Kyoto, and may be reached via the Karasuma Line subway.

The complex is the location for the finale of John Frankenheimer's cult 1982 martial arts action film The Challenge, starring Scott Glenn and Toshiro Mifune. The complex also serves as the backdrop for a meeting between Harry Kilmer (Robert Mitchum) and Goro Tanaka (James Shigeta) in The Yakuza (1975).

Past events 
 1994 International Telecommunication Union Plenipotentiary Conference  
 1997 United Nations Framework Convention on Climate Change (Kyoto Protocol)
 2003 World Water Forum

Access

Karasuma Line: Kokusaikaikan Station
Kyoto City Bus: Kokusaikaikan Sta.
Kyoto Bus: Kokusaikaikan-ekimae

References 

 R. Stephen Sennott, Encyclopedia of 20th-Century Architecture, Taylor & Francis, 2003, page 739. .

Buildings and structures in Kyoto
Convention centers in Japan
Event venues established in 1966
1966 establishments in Japan